Britannia Points Halt railway station was a short-lived conditional stop on the Romney, Hythe and Dymchurch Railway in Kent, England, for about two years from the start of 1929 to approximately 1930.

History
As a 'conditional stop' Britannia Points (or "The Britannia") has historically been referred to as a 'station' merely for convenience, as conditional stops are not really stations at all in any formal sense, but are simply trackside locations where trains will stop in response to a hand signal given to the driver.

The conditional stop at this location first appeared in the timetable for 1929, but working experience showed that very little use was made of the facility. The conditional stop was withdrawn from the railway's timetables about 1930.

The name "Britannia" was derived from a nearby public house. Although the original pub has been demolished, a replacement (bearing the same name) was constructed near to Dungeness station, and is still trading.

Britannia Points
Britannia Points are the points controlling the balloon loop at Dungeness. From 1928 until the end of World War II they marked the point of divergence of the two running lines. From 1946 (when the line was reduced to single track operation) to the present day they have taken the form of spring-loaded points allowing the single track to return onto itself through the loop.

Britannia Points now form a token section on Intensive Service Days, which enables three trains to be in the New Romney to Dungeness Section at any one time.

Photogallery

Disused railway stations in Kent
Heritage railway stations in Kent
Transport in Folkestone and Hythe
1928 establishments in England
Lydd
Railway stations in Great Britain opened in the 20th century